Samuel Henry Butcher DCL LLD  (16 April 1850 – 29 December 1910) was an Anglo-Irish classical scholar and politician.

Life

Samuel Henry Butcher was born in Dublin to Samuel Butcher, Bishop of Meath and Mary Leahy.

He was educated at Marlborough College in Wiltshire and then received a place at Trinity College, Cambridge, attending between 1869 and 1873 where he was Senior Classic and Chancellor's medalist. Elected fellow of Trinity in 1874, he left the college on his marriage, in 1876, to the daughter of Archbishop Trench. From 1876 to 1882 he was a fellow of University College, Oxford, and tutored there. From 1882 to 1903 he was Professor of Greek at the University of Edinburgh succeeding Prof John Stuart Blackie. During this period he lived at 27 Palmerston Place in Edinburgh's West End. He was succeeded at the University of Edinburgh by Prof Alexander William Mair.

He was one of the two Members of Parliament for Cambridge University, between 1906 and his death, representing the Unionist Party.

He was President of the British Academy, 1909–1910.

He died in London on 29 December 1910, and his body was returned to Scotland and interred at the Dean Cemetery in Edinburgh with his wife, Rose Julia Butcher (1840-1902). His grave has a pale granite Celtic cross and is located near the northern path of the north section in the original cemetery.

Family

John Butcher, 1st Baron Danesfort was his younger brother.

He married Rose Julia Trench (1840-1902) in 1876. They had no children.

Publications

His many publications included, in collaboration with Andrew Lang, a prose translation of Homer's Odyssey which appeared in 1879 and the OCT edition of Demosthenes, Orationes, vol. I (Or. 1–19, Oxford, 1903), II.i (Or. 20–26, Oxford, 1907).

References

External links 
 
 
 
 

1850 births
1910 deaths
Politicians from Dublin (city)
Alumni of Trinity College, Cambridge
Academics of the University of Edinburgh
Burials at the Dean Cemetery
Fellows of the Royal Society of Edinburgh
Scholars of Greek language
English classical scholars
Irish classical scholars
Members of the Parliament of the United Kingdom for the University of Cambridge
UK MPs 1906–1910
UK MPs 1910
UK MPs 1910–1918
Fellows of the British Academy
Irish people of English descent
People educated at Marlborough College
Liberal Unionist Party MPs for English constituencies
Irish translators
English translators
Presidents of the British Academy
Classical scholars of the University of Cambridge
Classical scholars of the University of Oxford
Classical scholars of the University of Edinburgh
20th-century British translators
19th-century British translators
Translators of Homer
Writers from Dublin (city)